

Royal Family 
King Chulalongkorn described the order of precedence in his literature "Traditional of Royal Family of Siam".

Gentlemen 
 The Sovereign
 The Viceroy (Grand Commander)  
 The Viceroy (Commander) 
 The Deputy Vice King
 Sons of the Former Sovereign and Queen
 Great Uncles of the Sovereign  
 Uncles of the Sovereign 
 Brothers of the Sovereign 
 Sons of the Sovereign and Queen 
 Sons of the Former Sovereign and Royal Consort 
 Great Uncles of the Sovereign  
 Uncles of the Sovereign 
 Brothers of the Sovereign 
 Sons of the Sovereign and Royal Consort 
 Sons of the Former Sovereign and Royal Concubine  
 Great Uncle of the Sovereign  
 Uncles of the Sovereign 
 Brothers of the Sovereign 
 Sons of the Sovereign and Royal Concubine  
 Nephews of the Sovereign 
 Grandsons of the Sovereign who are sons of son of the Sovereign and daughter of the Sovereign
 Sons of the Viceroy and Royal Consort 
 Sons of the Former Viceroy
 Sons of the Viceroy
 Grandsons of the Sovereign who are sons of son of the Sovereign and Queen or Royal Consort and Princess
 Grandsons of the Sovereign who are sons of son of the Sovereign and Royal Concubine and Princess 
 Sons of Prince Matayabitak, the Prince  Maternal Grandfather of Rama V 
 Sons of the Deputy Vice King and Royal Consort 
 Grandsons of the Sovereign who are sons of son of Sovereign and the commoner
 Royal Great Grandsons of the Sovereign

Ladies 
 Queen Mother  
 The Sovereign's Consort (Queen) 
 Queen Dowager
 Royal Consort  
 Daughters of the Former Sovereign and Queen
 Great Aunts of the Sovereign  
 Aunts of the Sovereign 
 Sisters of the Sovereign 
 Daughters of the Sovereign and Queen 
 Daughters of the Former Sovereign and Royal Consort 
 Great Aunts of the Sovereign  
 Aunts of the Sovereign 
 Sisters of the Sovereign 
 Daughters of the Sovereign and Royal Consort 
 Daughters of the Former Sovereign and Royal Concubine  
 Great Aunts of the Sovereign  
 Aunts of the Sovereign 
 Sisters of the Sovereign 
 Daughters of the Sovereign and Royal Concubine  
 Nieces of the Sovereign 
 Royal Consort who are granddaughters of the Sovereign 
 Granddaughters of the Sovereign who are daughters of son of the Sovereign and daughter of the Sovereign
 Daughters of the Viceroy and Royal Consort 
 Daughters of the Former Viceroy
 Daughters of the Viceroy
 Granddaughters of the Sovereign who are daughters of son of the Sovereign and Queen or Royal Consort and Princess
 Granddaughters of the Sovereign who are sons of daughters of the Sovereign and Royal Concubine and Princess 
 Daughters of Prince Matayabitak, the Prince  Maternal Grandfather of Rama V 
 Daughters of the Deputy Vice King and Royal Consort 
 Granddaughters of the Sovereign who are daughters of son of Sovereign and the commoner
 Royal Great Granddaughters of the Sovereign

Current Order of Precedence

References

Thai monarchy
Orders of precedence
Society of Thailand
Orders, decorations, and medals of Thailand